Manuel Aravena (born 29 June 1954) is a Chilean former cyclist. He competed in the individual road race event at the 1984 Summer Olympics.

References

External links
 

1954 births
Living people
Chilean male cyclists
Olympic cyclists of Chile
Cyclists at the 1984 Summer Olympics
Place of birth missing (living people)